Ferezneh (also Romanized as Farazneh, Farezneh, and Farzaneh; also known as Borj-e Farīzneh, Farīzna, and Farīzneh) is a village in Karat Rural District, in the Central District of Taybad County, Razavi Khorasan Province, Iran. At the 2006 census, its population was 1,280, in 273 families.

See also 

 List of cities, towns and villages in Razavi Khorasan Province

References 

Populated places in Taybad County